Will Anthony Parker (born February 11, 1966) is a former American football cornerback who played nine seasons in the National Football League, mainly for the Minnesota Vikings.  He attended McClintock High School in Tempe, Arizona, before attending Arizona State University.  His son, Colin, was a redshirt freshman at Arizona State University during the 2007 season.

External links
 NFL.com player page
 Anthony Parker at Pro Football Reference
 Anthony Parker at Football Database

1966 births
Living people
People from Sylacauga, Alabama
Players of American football from Alabama
Sportspeople from Tempe, Arizona
American football cornerbacks
Arizona State Sun Devils football players
Indianapolis Colts players
New York/New Jersey Knights players
Kansas City Chiefs players
Minnesota Vikings players
St. Louis Rams players
Tampa Bay Buccaneers players